...that great October sound is the first album released by Norwegian singer/songwriter Thomas Dybdahl.

Track listing
"From Grace"
"All's Not Lost"
"That Great October Sound"
"Life Here Is Gold"
"Tomorrow Stays The Same"
"Postulate"
"Adelaide"
"John Wayne"
"Love's Lost"
"Dreamweaver"
"Outro"
"I Need Love Baby, Love, Not Trouble" (Bonus Track)

References

2002 albums
Thomas Dybdahl albums